Howard E. Aldrich (born 1943) is an American sociologist who is Kenan Professor of Sociology and Professor of Entrepreneurship at the University of North Carolina at Chapel Hill. 

He is also a Faculty Research Associate at the Department of Strategy & Entrepreneurship at the Duke University Fuqua School of Business. He is a Fellow of Sidney Sussex College at Cambridge University and Faculty Fellow of the Center for Study of Economy and Society at Cornell University. Aldrich's main research interests are entrepreneurship, team formation, evolutionary theory, economic sociology and inequality, and gender issues in entrepreneurship.

Aldrich is best known for his work in applying an evolutionary perspective to organizational emergence and change. One of his seminal works is the 1999 book Organizations Evolving, which won the Academy of Management George Terry Award and was the co-winner of the Max Weber Award from the American Sociological Association's Section on Organizations, Occupations, and Work.

Early career 
Aldrich received his BA in sociology from Bowling Green University in 1965 and went on to pursue his PhD at the University of Michigan which he received in 1969. 

In 1966, he directed a survey project through the Institute of Social Research, which explored ethnic succession in the small business populations of high-crime areas of Boston, Washington DC, and Chicago. Aldrich carried out subsequent waves of the study in 1968 and presented his dissertation, titled Organizations in a Hostile Environment for his 1969 PhD. This study led to follow-up studies in 1970 and 1972, in a collaboration with Albert J. Reiss Jr.

Following the completion of his dissertation in 1969, Aldrich accepted an assistant professorship at Cornell University's School of Industrial and Labor Relations. There he began to further develop his evolutionary perspectives on organizational theory, and wrote a number of papers that explored context as a driver for organizational change, including a paper titled "Organizational Boundaries and Inter-Organizational Conflict", and eventually formed the basis for his 1979 book, Organizations and Environments. Following up on his earlier studies in the US, in 1975, Aldrich also undertook comparative research on ethnic business succession in the UK. Several other waves in subsequent years revealed similar evidence of business populations changing in response to population-level residential changes. These studies also ultimately formed the basis of his 1990 book Ethnic Entrepreneurs, co-authored with Roger Waldinger and Robin Ward.

Evolutionary perspective on entrepreneurship 
Aldrich's most influential works have presented, developed, and refined an evolutionary approach to organizational behavior and entrepreneurship. At the heart of this approach is the assumption that evolutionary processes are driven by entrepreneurs and organizations’ struggles to obtain scarce resources, both social and physical.

Aldrich's perspective was developed throughout the 1970s, at a time when new approaches to organizational analysis were blossoming around the world. It was during the 1980s and 1990s that Aldrich's interest in entrepreneurship materialized and he wrote several papers on the subject.

Career at the University of North Carolina 
Aldrich moved from Cornell University to the Department of Sociology at the University North Carolina, Chapel Hill in 1982. He was the first chair of the revamped Curriculum in Industrial Relations, later renamed the Management and Society (M&S) Curriculum within the sociology department. He chaired the M&S program until 2003, when he became department chair of sociology, serving until 2014. Under his direction, the department’s journal, Social Forces, switched from being self-published to becoming one of the major social science journals published by Oxford University Press.

Honors and awards
 Entrepreneurship Researcher of the Year Award, Swedish Foundation of Small Business Research, 2000.
 Distinguished Scholar Award, Academy of Management Organization and Management Theory Division, 2000.
 George R. Terry Award, Academy of Management, Best Management Book Published in 1999.
 J. Carlyle Sitterson Freshman Teaching Award, 2002, UNC-CH.
 Mentor Award, Academy of Management Entrepreneurship Division, 2007.
 IDEA Foundational Paper Award Academy of Management Entrepreneurship Division, 2009. For a paper co-authored with Marlena Fiol: Fools Rush In? The Institutional Context of Industry Creation.
 Babson College Entrepreneurship Research Conference Lifetime Membership Award, 2013. 
 Honorary Doctoral Degree, Mid-Sweden University, Ostersund, Sweden, 2014.
 Honorary Doctoral Degree, Bowling Green State University, Ohio, 2015.

Selected books 
 Organizations and Environments (Prentice-Hall, 1979). First edition. 
 Ethnic Entrepreneurs: Immigrant Business in Industrial Societies, co-edited with Robert Waldinger & Robin Ward (SAGE Publications, 1990). 
 Organizations Evolving, co-edited with Martin Ruef (SAGE Publications, 2006). 
 An Evolutionary Approach to Entrepreneurship: Selected Essays (Edward Elgar, 2012).

Selected articles 
 "Social Capital and Entrepreneurship" with Phillip H. Kim, in Zoltan Acs and David Audretsch, editors. Foundations and Trends in Entrepreneurship, 2005.
 "A Life Course Perspective on Occupational Inheritance: Self-employed Parents and Their Children." with Philip H. Kim, in Martin Ruef and Michael Lounsbury, in Research in the Sociology of Organizations. Elsevier JAI, pp. 33–82. 2007.
 "In Defence of Generalized Darwinism" with Geoffrey M. Hodgson, David L. Hull, Thorbjørn Knudsen, Joel Mokyr and Viktor J. Vanberg, in Journal of Evolutionary Economics, 18, 5 (October 2008): 577-596.
 "Group Work Can Be Gratifying: Understanding & Overcoming Resistance to Cooperative Learning" with Junko Shimazoe, in College Teaching 58: 1-6. 2010.
 "Resources, Environmental Changes, and Survival: Asymmetric Paths of Young Independent and Subsidiary Organizations" with Steven W. Bradley, Howard E. Aldrich, Dean Shephard, and Johan Wiklund, in Strategic Management Journal. 32, 5 (May): 486-509. 2011
 "Lost in Translation: Cultural Codes are not Blueprints" with Tiantian Yang, in Strategic Entrepreneurship Journal, 6: 1-17. 2012.
 "The Emergence of Entrepreneurship as an Academic Field: A Personal Essay on Institutional Entrepreneurship" in Research Policy, 41 (7): 1240-1248. 2012.
 "More Than a Metaphor: Assessing the Historical Legacy of Resource Dependence and Its Contemporary Promise as a Theory of Environmental Complexity" with Tyler Wright and J. Adam Cobb, in Royston Greenwood, editor, The Annals of the Academy of Management, Volume 7, Number 1. pp. 439–486. 2013.
 "Who’s the Boss? Explaining Gender Inequality in Entrepreneurial Teams" with Tiantian Yang, in American Sociological Review, 79 (2): 303-327. 2014.
 "History and evolutionary theory" with Stephen Lippmann in Marcelo Bucheli and R. Daniel Wadhwani, editors, Organizations in Time: History, Theory, Methods. Oxford: Oxford University Press. 2014.
 "Collaboration between Anthropology and Management Researchers: Obstacles and Opportunities" with Alex Stewart, in Academy of Management Perspectives, 29, 2: 173-192. 2015.
 "Perpetually on the Eve of Destruction? Understanding Exits in Capitalist Societies at Multiple Levels of Analysis" in Dawn R. DeTienne and Karl Wennberg, editors, Research Handbook of Entrepreneurial Exit. Pages 11 – 41. Cheltenham UK: Edward Elgar publishing. 2015.

References

External links 

 Howard E. Aldrich personal web page
 Howard E. Aldrich on Research Gate
 Howard E. Aldrich on BE Press
 Howard E. Aldrich at Kenan–Flagler Business School
 Howard E. Aldrich at Fuqua School of Business

1943 births
Living people
American sociologists
American business theorists
Bowling Green State University alumni
University of Michigan College of Literature, Science, and the Arts alumni
University of North Carolina at Chapel Hill faculty